Hiam (Arabic: هيام‎) is an Arabic feminine given name that may refer to the following notable people:
Hiam Amani Hafizuddin, American-born beauty queen
Hiam Abbass (born 1960), Palestinian actress and film director
Hiam Taeima (1961–2020), Syrian actress

Arabic feminine given names